Posyolok Lnozavoda is a rural locality (a settlement) in Golovinskoye Rural Settlement, Sudogodsky District, Vladimir Oblast, Russia. The population was 34 as of 2010.

Geography 
It is located 3 km east from Golovino, 25 km west from Sudogda.

References 

Rural localities in Sudogodsky District